Mera Damad is a 1995 family-drama Indian Hindi film directed by Partho Ghosh and produced by Shipra Biswas and Tushar Mazumdar. It stars Utpal Dutt, Ashok Kumar, Farooq Sheikh, Zarina Wahab, Rakesh Bedi, Prema Narayan, Tariq Khan and Jankidas in lead roles. Music for the film was scored by Salil Choudhury and background music by Babul Bose.

Plot

Sitanath Ardhnarayan Choudhry and Ajit Khanna are old friends. Sitanath has a daughter named Sunita, and Ajit has a son named Jai. Both fathers would like their respective children to meet each other and get married. In order to do this, Ajit asks Jai to travel to Sitanath's village, meet Sunita, and if found compatible, make arrangements for marriage, to which Jai agrees to. On reaching Rampur railway station, Jai, in the company of his friend, Pradeep, come across a man named Ravi, who tells them they are in the wrong village, and directs them to a mansion run by an eccentric owner, so that they can spend the night there, and then take the train back the next day. Ravi warns them about the owner, who likes to talk all night to anyone who listens. Both Jai and Pradeep meet the owner, and are quite abrupt with him. The next day, Jai meets the owner's daughter Kimi, and falls in love with her.

Cast

 Farooq Sheikh as Jai Khanna
 Zarina Wahab as Kimi/Sunita
 Ashok Kumar as Barrister Ajit Khanna
 Utpal Dutt as Sitanath Chaudhary
 Prema Narayan as Shalu
 Jankidas as Shalu's bapu
 Rakesh Bedi as Ravi
 Praveen Paul as Smt. Chaudhary
 Priyadarshini as Jharna
 Bhagwan Dada as drunkard
 Tariq Khan (actor) as Pradeep
 Ava Mukherjee (as Abha Mukherjee) as Radha Devi Khanna

References

External links 
 
 

1990s Hindi-language films
Indian drama films
Films scored by Salil Chowdhury